The 1941 Hawaii Deans football team was an American football team that represented the University of Hawaii as an independent during the 1941 college football season.  The team compiled an 8–1 record and outscored opponents by a total of 280 to 83.  The season was shortened by two games following the Attack on Pearl Harbor.

Tom Kaulukukui and Eugene Gill were co-head coaches. It was Kaulukukui's first year as a head coach; Gill had been head coach of the team in 1940 as well.

During a September 24 game against Pacific (CA) in Stockton, California, a distressed army flying cadet tried to land his plane at the stadium, diving for 30 minutes "a few feet over the heads of terrified spectators and players and clipped the stadium power line, darkening the field." The cadet ultimately landed his plane safely in the stadium parking lot.

Schedule

Shrine Game and Pearl Harbor

On the afternoon of December 6, 1941, in the Shrine Football Classic, Hawaii defeated  at Honolulu Stadium. The game drew a crowd of 25,000 persons, the largest paid attendance in Hawaii history to that point. The attendees included Territorial Governor Joseph Poindexter, Honolulu Mayor Lester Petrie, and Lt. Gen. Walter Short, the U.S. military commander responsible for the defense of U.S. military installations in Hawaii; the game was preceded by a "spectacle" of marching bands, including performances by the U.S. Marine band and bands from the University of Hawaii, Royal Hawaiian, McKinley High, St. Louis College, Kamehameha, Roosevelt High, Punahou Academy, Honolulu Plantation Co., and others.

Early the following morning, the Attack on Pearl Harbor occurred, beginning the Pacific War. The team's remaining game against San Jose State and Nevada were cancelled. The San Jose State team was already in Honolulu at the time of the attack. The San Jose State and Willamette players were stranded in Hawaii due to the emergency following the attack. The Hawaii, Willamette, and San Jose State football teams all volunteered to perform special police duties during the emergency.

The Hawaii football program was suspended for the duration of the war.

References

Further reading
 

Hawaii
Hawaii Rainbow Warriors football seasons
Hawaii Rainbows football